Shane Coffey is an American actor. He is best known for his role as Holden Strauss in Freeform's Pretty Little Liars.

Early life
Coffey was born in Houston, Texas and raised in nearby Spring. He studied theater at the University of Southern California. He is a founding member of The Casitas Group, an independent theater company started in 2008, alongside Troian Bellisario.

Career
Coffey's first acting part was playing Patrick for one episode on Summerland alongside Jesse McCartney.

In January 2012, Coffey joined the recurring cast of Pretty Little Liars as Holden Strauss, an old friend of Aria's, who becomes her way of covering when she's actually going to see Ezra Fitz.

Coffey also portrayed Jimmy Nash on The Secret Life of the American Teenager. In 2012, he wrapped on a short film called Exiles, a modern rendition of Shakespeare's Romeo and Juliet with a twist.

Coffey and Troian Bellisario, Pretty Little Liars co-star, make music under the name FAMILY.

In 2013, Coffey appeared in an Audi Super Bowl commercial titled Prom.

In 2015, Coffey starred in Lord Huron - "Fool for Love" music video.

Coffey plays a lead role in the 2016 film Sugar Mountain, directed by Richard Gray.

Filmography

References

External links
 

American male film actors
American male television actors
Living people
Year of birth missing (living people)